Fox Chase Farm is one of two working farms in the city of Philadelphia, Pennsylvania (W.B. Saul High School's Farm in Roxborough is the other).  Formerly owned by the Wistar family, the farm is located on Pine Road in the Fox Chase neighborhood of Northeast Philadelphia on the border with Montgomery County.  The farm gradually became surrounded by the city's residential neighborhoods and was purchased by the city in 1975. It is now run as an educational farm by the School District of Philadelphia.

The farm was added to the National Register of Historic Places in 2005 under its old name of Stanley, a name it acquired when William Penn granted the land to Lord Stanley.

Gallery

References

External links
www.TheFoxChaseFarm.com]
Listing at Philadelphia Architects and Buildings

Education in Philadelphia
Farms on the National Register of Historic Places in Pennsylvania
Queen Anne architecture in Pennsylvania
Federal architecture in Pennsylvania
1822 establishments in Pennsylvania
Municipal parks in Philadelphia
Buildings and structures in Philadelphia
Fox Chase, Philadelphia
Historic districts on the National Register of Historic Places in Pennsylvania
National Register of Historic Places in Philadelphia